Carla Galle (10 May 1948 – 20 January 2022) was a Belgian medley swimmer. She competed in two events at the 1968 Summer Olympics. Galle died on 20 January 2022, at the age of 73.

References

External links
 

1948 births
2022 deaths
Belgian female medley swimmers
Olympic swimmers of Belgium
Swimmers at the 1968 Summer Olympics
Universiade medalists in swimming
Sportspeople from Aalst, Belgium
Universiade bronze medalists for Belgium
Medalists at the 1967 Summer Universiade